David McGowan is the name of:

David McGowan (archer) (1838–1924), American archer
David McGowan (footballer) (born 1988), Scottish football player
David McGowan (rower) (born 1981), Australian Olympic rower
David McGowan (rugby union) (born 1986), Irish rugger, played in France
David McGowan, character in Village of the Damned (1995 film)
David McGowan (producer), producer of the documentary The Mark of the Maker